Ansley Common is a village in the Ansley civil parish of Warwickshire, England. Population statistics for Ansley Common fall under the civil parish.

References

External links

Villages in Warwickshire